Trevor Keegan may refer to:
 Trevor Keegan, offensive lineman for the Michigan Wolverines football team
 A showbiz correspondent on The Afternoon Show